David Haynes Mathis (born February 22, 1974) is an American professional golfer.

Career
Mathis was born in Winston-Salem, North Carolina. He played college golf at Campbell University. He turned professional in 1997.

Mathis played on the mini-tours and then on the Canadian Tour from 2001 to 2005. He played on the Nationwide Tour from 2006 to 2008, winning once at the 2008 BMW Charity Pro-Am and earning his PGA Tour card for 2009. He played the PGA Tour in 2009 but did not earn enough to retain his card. He played the Nationwide Tour again in 2010, winning again at the Winn-Dixie Jacksonville Open and finishing 13th on the money list to regain his PGA Tour card for 2011.

Professional wins (4)

Nationwide Tour wins (2)

Other wins (2)
2004 one TarHeel Tour win
2005 Michelin Morelia Classic (Canadian Tour)

See also
2008 Nationwide Tour graduates
2010 Nationwide Tour graduates

References

External links

American male golfers
PGA Tour golfers
Korn Ferry Tour graduates
Campbell Fighting Camels golfers
Golfers from North Carolina
Sportspeople from Winston-Salem, North Carolina
People from Wake Forest, North Carolina
1974 births
Living people